Daviesia campephylla is a species of flowering plant in the family Fabaceae and is endemic to a restricted part of Western Australia. It is a low, spreading shrub with ascending branches, phyllodes shaped like looping caterpillars, and yellow flowers with faint red markings.

Description

Taxonomy and naming
Daviesia campephylla was first formally described in 1995 by Michael Crisp in Australian Systematic Botany from specimens collected by Ken Newbey near Munglinup in 1980. The specific epithet (campephylla) means "caterpillar-leaved".

Distribution and habitat
This species of pea grows in a restricted area between Cascade, the Oldfield River and Munglinup on roadsides and nearby mallee in the Mallee biogeographic region of south-western Western Australia.

Conservation status
Daviesia campephylla is classified as "not threatened" by the Department of Biodiversity, Conservation and Attractions.

References

campephylla
Eudicots of Western Australia
Plants described in 1995
Taxa named by Michael Crisp